The Beatles (No. 1) is an EP released by the Beatles in the United Kingdom on 1 November 1963. It is the Beatles' third British EP and was only released in mono; its catalogue number is Parlophone GEP 8883. The EP contains songs from Please Please Me, and its cover was taken in the same photoshoot as the Please Please Me and 1962–1966 covers. It was also released in Argentina and New Zealand.

Track listing
All songs originally upon this EP had previously been released on the Please Please Me LP.

UK EP sales chart performance
Entry Date : 9 November 1963
Highest Position : 2
Weeks in Chart : 29 Weeks

References

1963 EPs
The Beatles EPs
Albums produced by George Martin
Parlophone EPs